The first USS Jouett (DD-41) was a modified  in the United States Navy during World War I and later in the United States Coast Guard, designated as CG-13. She was named for Rear admiral James Edward Jouett.

Jouett was laid down on 7 March 1911 by Bath Iron Works, Ltd., Bath, Maine; launched on 15 April 1912; sponsored by Miss Marylee Nally; and commissioned at Boston, Massachusetts on 24 May 1912, Lieutenant Commander W. P. Cronan in command.

Pre-World War I
Jouett joined the Atlantic Fleet Torpedo Flotilla and operated off the East Coast until early 1914, when events in Mexico threatened American interests and officials at Tampico arrested American sailors without cause. Jouett supported the landing of Marines at Veracruz on 21 April 1914. Returning to the East Coast after this operation, the destroyer continued to carry out training maneuvers until the United States entered World War I in April 1917.

World War I
The ship was assigned patrol in Delaware Bay in April 1917 and remained on that duty until sailing from New York on 8 August as an escort for five troopships bound for France. After returning from Europe, Jouett resumed patrolling until she arrived at New London, Connecticut, on 15 January 1918 for experimentation with antisubmarine detection devices. Completing this duty on 4 June, the ship operated until the armistice with a special anti-submarine group along the East Coast of the United States.

Inter-war period
Following the war, Jouett conducted training exercises and fleet maneuvers until entering Philadelphia Navy Yard on 20 July 1919. She decommissioned on 24 November and remained inactive until being loaned to the Coast Guard on 23 April 1924 for use as a cutter. Returned to the Navy on 22 May 1931, she was sold for scrap to Michael Flynn Inc., Brooklyn, New York.

References

External links

 

 

Paulding-class destroyers
Monaghan-class destroyers
World War I destroyers of the United States
Ships built in Bath, Maine
1912 ships